The year of 2011 in CONCACAF marked the 48th year of CONCACAF competitions.

Events

Men 

From 5 June through 25 June, CONCACAF hosted its eleventh biannual regional tournament, the CONCACAF Gold Cup. Hosted in the United States, it was the fourth-consecutive tournament that the Gold Cup was solely held in the United States. The Gold Cup saw Mexico earn their sixth Gold Cup honor, by defeating tournament hosts, and longtime rivals, the United States, by a 4–2 scoreline. The Mexican team earned their way into the finals through the virtue of winning Group A with a perfect 3–0–0 record, prior to defeating Guatemala and Honduras in the quarterfinals and semifinals, respectively. The U.S. team, finished as runners-up in 2011 CONCACAF Gold Cup Group C after posting a record of two wins, a loss and no draws. In the knockout stage, the U.S. defeated Group B winners, Jamaica by 2–0 scoreline, before defeating Group C winners, Panama 1–0 in the semifinals.

 18 June – 10 July — 2011 FIFA U-17 World Cup in Mexico
  
  
  
 4th:

Women 

 2 – 9 March — 2011 Algarve Cup in Portugal
  
  
  
 4th: 
 26 June – 17 July — 2011 FIFA Women's World Cup in Germany
  
  
  
 4th:

News 

 CONCACAF representative Chuck Blazer step down from his position.
 In the United States and Canada, Major League Soccer expanded from 16 to 18 clubs by adding franchises in Portland, Oregon and Vancouver British Columbia. The clubs are the Portland Timbers and Vancouver Whitecaps FC, respectively and retain their historical names dating back to the 1970s.

Continental champions

Champions League 

In April 2011, the 2011 CONCACAF Champions League Finals was contested between Monterrey of the Mexican Primera División, and Real Salt Lake of the United States and Canada's Major League Soccer to determine the champion of the 2010–11 CONCACAF Champions League. The finals, made it the first time in the Champions League-era that the final was not an all-Mexican affair. The final also marked the first time since 2000 that an MLS club made it to the continental finals. The two-legged series ended in Monterrey's favor, defeating Salt Lake 3–2 on aggregate.

That same month, the final stage of the 2011 CFU Club Championship was contested as the Puerto Rico Islanders won their third Caribbean club title, defeating Haiti's Tempête FC in the final. With Guyana's Alpha United defeating Trinidad and Tobago's Defence Force, the 2011–12 Champions League will feature Caribbean clubs from outside of Puerto Rico and Trinidad and Tobago.

In July 2011, the 2011–12 CONCACAF Champions League began with the Preliminary Round being held. The following month, the group stage of the tournament began. For the first time ever in a meaningful competition, an American soccer team defeated a Mexican soccer club on Mexican soil, as FC Dallas defeated UNAM 1–0. During the same round of group matches, Seattle Sounders FC became the second American club to defeat a Mexican team in Mexico, this time beating the defending 2010–11 champions, Monterrey by an identical 1–0 scoreline.

 2010–11 Bracket

SuperLiga 

After four seasons of the North American SuperLiga, the tournament was discontinued, with MLS commissioner Don Garber commissioner stating that "SuperLiga was a great tournament which served its purpose during its time. CONCACAF got more and more committed to a continental tournament with the Champions League, which we’re very supportive of. It has delivered the value we intended in SuperLiga to put our teams against the best competition in this region".

Prior to the cancellation of the tournament, the SuperLiga had a format very similar to UEFA's Europa League in which the best clubs in the U.S. and Mexico not to qualify for the Champions League earned a berth into the tournament. The final SuperLiga championship involved Morelia of Mexico defeating New England Revolution of the United States, 2–1.

CFU Club championship 

Puerto Rico Islanders won the 2011 edition of the CFU Club Championship, making it both their second ever CFU Club title and their second-consecutive subcontinental championship. Played at Providence Stadium in Providence, Guyana on 27 May, the Islanders defeated Tempête of Haiti, 3–1, in extra time, to win the CFU Club Championship. Puerto Rico's Jay Needham scored for the Islanders in the 34th minute of regulation, while Tempête's Junior Charles scored in the 42nd minute. In extra time, Puerto Rico's Jonathan Faña netted in the 100th and 113th minute of play. For reaching the finals, both Puerto Rico Islanders and Tempête FC qualified into the preliminary round of the 2011–12 CONCACAF Champions League.

The third place match also determined the final entrant into the Champions League. There, Guyana's Alpha United became the first Guyanese club to qualify for the Champions League by defeating Trinidad and Tobago's Defence Force 4–3 in a penalty shoot-out.

Bracket

World Football Challenge 

Table

Results for CONCACAF clubs

All times are in the EDT time zone (UTC−4) (Local Times in parentheses).

Domestic league champions and premiers

List of champions

Men's 

The following list contains the champion of every men's association football league in the CONCACAF region.

Women's 

The following list contains the champion of every women's association football league in the CONCACAF region.

List of premiers 

Some CONCACAF nations determine their league champion through a post-season tournament. This list reflects on the team that won the premiership, often known as the team with the best regular season record. In seasons which the Apertura and Clasura and used to create an aggregate/relegation table for the season, the team with the better aggregate record is listed as the premier.

Domestic cup champions 

Several CONCACAF nations, most notably nations that do not use the Apertura/Clasura system host a domestic knockout cup that parallels the league seasons. These cups are open to all divisions of each nation's respective pyramid.

Men's

Women's

Deaths

Footnotes 

A.  The 2011 Costa Rican Verano is part of the 2010–11 Costa Rican Primera División season. 
B.  The 2011 Costa Rican Invierno is part of the 2011–12 Costa Rican Primera División season.
C.  The 2011 Salvadoran Clausura is part of the 2010–11 Salvadoran Primera División.
D.  The 2011 Salvadoran Apertura is part of the 2011–12 Salvadoran Primera División.
E.  Guatemala's Comunicaciones won both the 2011 Apertura and Clausura titles.
F. 
G. 
H. 
I. 
J. 
K. 
L.  The U.S. Virgin Islands Championship hosted respective regular seasons for each island's soccer league, but a tournament to determine the champion was not held.
M.  The W-League, though the second division women's soccer league in the United States is the top division of women's soccer in Canada.
N.  In the 2011 World Football Challenge, Canadian MLS club Vancouver Whitecaps FC and American MLS clubs Los Angeles Galaxy and Seattle Sounders FC represented the MLS Western team. 
O.  In the 2011 World Football Challenge, American MLS clubs Chicago Fire, New England Revolution, Philadelphia Union represented the MLS Eastern Team.

References